Ahmad Abdullāh al- Masdūsī was a Pakistani activist and lawyer.  He was very active in social welfare, and community improvement activities.

He joined Malis-e-Ittehad-ul-Muslimeen in 1938. With the beginning of political career he gave up his legal practice and moved to Hyderabad. His villa was near the Mouzam Jahi Market. He was involved in the legal proceedings around the annexation of Hyderabad by India. He migrated to Karachi, in Pakistan, after the annexation. He authored several books including Living Religions of the World, a Socio-Political Study (1962) and served as Professor of Law at Karachi University.

References

1905 births
1968 deaths
Pakistani writers
Pakistani people of Yemeni descent
Hadhrami people
Lawyers from Karachi
Writers from Karachi
20th-century Pakistani lawyers
Pakistani people of Hyderabadi descent